Swan Village Gas Works, is a historical manufacturing plant in the United Kingdom for the production of coal gas, or, as it was known in the vernacular, "town gas". The works are situated in Swan Village, a part of West Bromwich in the metropolitan borough of Sandwell. Most of the works have been demolished although a few relics survive. Parts of the works are still in operation today as part of the National Grid.

History

In 1825, the Birmingham and Staffordshire Gas Light Company was founded by act of parliament to manufacture and supply gas to Birmingham and a number of surrounding towns, including West Bromwich; the lighting of the main road through the town was also mentioned in the Act.  The Old Works (as seen on the map) were the first part of the complex to be constructed, and when completed in 1829 were the largest in the country. 

Coal was originally delivered to the Old Works by the Ridgacre Canal, with a basin connected to the canal constructed to allow the loading and unloading of coal barges. Eventually the railway arrived in 1854 with the opening of the Great Western Railway's Birmingham to Wolverhampton line. Swan Village Station was situated on the line, next to the works. From the station branched the Great Bridge line linking up with the South Staffordshire Line which ran to Dudley. The Swan Village Basin line also branched off just before the station at Swan Village that fed into the works. This line was solely used for freight transportation only.

With the railways in place, more gas production was possible, thus lowering the price of gas for consumers. Canal traffic diminished as a result. The photograph on the right shows the works with the Swan Village Basin line feeding into the complex. The gas holder on the right still exists today, albeit being empty hence why it is missing height.

Over the years, changing working patterns and the increase in demand for gas following nationalisation in 1949 meant that the works needed to expand. A decision was made by the Gas committee of Birmingham City Council, and the New Works were opened in 1953. It was fortunate that surplus land bought a century and a quarter previously allowed for expansion. The increased rail traffic necessitated extensive new sidings outside the works to accommodate additional wagons.

With the discovery of natural gas in the North Sea during the 1960s, coal gas became a thing of the past. The development of the National Grid meant that delivering coal by railway was an out of date method, thus the Swan Village Basin line was removed. The Great Bridge line closed in 1964 as a result of the Beeching cuts, with Swan Village Station eventually closing in 1972.

Remains

Little is left of the works today. The Old Works were demolished as the area around Swan Village was developed into an industrial estate. The only surviving relics of the New Works are two gas holders and some brickwork on what remains of the original route of Swan Lane, the lane itself has fallen victim to industrial development. A third gas holder not shown on the map was installed at a later date, but has since been demolished. A picture is available below.

The only remains of the Swan Lane Basin and Great Bridge railway lines are the extra gaps under the bridge on Bilhay Lane where the lines converged with GWR's Birmingham to Wolverhampton line, which still exists today as Line 1 of the West Midlands Metro. Embankments around the site offer clues to the paths of the original railway. The construction of modern Swan Lane has obliterated any signs that a level crossing by the Old Loco Shed was ever there.

New buildings have been built on the site of the New Works in between the old gas holders, that operate as the Sandwell Station on the National Grid.

One of the small steam locomotives that used to shunt the gas works sidings, Peckett 0-4-0ST 2018/1947, is preserved at the Foxfield Railway, Blythe Bridge, Staffordshire.

See also
Town Gas
Natural Gas

Photographs

References

Architecture in England
Buildings and structures in the West Midlands (county)